Men's freestyle wrestling competition began in the Olympics in 1904. FILA began holding World Championships in men's freestyle in 1951. During Olympic years, FILA suspends the World Championships.

Tsarist Russia did not send freestyle wrestlers to the Olympics for the country authorities didn't recognize the sport back then (only Greco-Roman or French wrestling as it was known then was widely practised and contested in the Russian Empire.) The Soviet Union began competing in freestyle wrestling at the 1952 Summer Olympics. The Soviet Union boycotted the Olympics in 1984. After the collapse of the Soviet Union, most former Soviet republics competed as a single Unified Team in 1992, and competed separately thereafter.

List of results by the Soviet Union and Russia in Men's Freestyle Wrestling at the Olympics and World Championships

1904

1908

1920

1924–1936

1948–1968

1969–1996

1997–2001

2002–2013

2014–2017

Note- 61 kg and 70 kg were non-Olympic weights and were therefore wrestled at the 2016 World Wrestling Championships in Budapest, Hungary on December 10–11, 2016.

2018–

Statistics

Medalists by weight, 1904–2010

Medalists by era

Average performances by era

See also

United States results in men's freestyle wrestling
List of World and Olympic Champions in men's freestyle wrestling
List of Cadet, Junior, and Espoir World Champions in men's freestyle wrestling
Iranian results in men's freestyle wrestling

References
FILA Database
USA Wrestling Olympic Team History
USA Wrestling World Team History

Soviet Freestyle Mens
Freestyle Mens
Freestyle Mens
Freestyle wrestling